The Washington State House elections, 2016 are biennial elections in which each of the 49 legislative districts in Washington choose two people to represent them in the Washington State House of Representatives. Roughly half of the members of the Washington Senate are elected concurrently to four-year terms from identical legislative districts. The election was held on November 8, 2016.

A top two primary election in August 2016 determines which two candidates appear on the November ballot. Candidate were allowed to write in a  party preference.

Overview

Composition

Results

District 1

District 2

District 3

District 4

District 5

District 6

District 7

District 8

District 9

District 10

District 11

District 12

District 13

District 14

District 15

District 16

District 17

District 18

District 19

District 20

District 21

District 22

District 23

District 24

District 25

District 26

District 27

District 28

District 29

District 30

District 31

District 32

District 33

District 34

District 35

District 36

District 37

District 38

District 39

District 40

District 41

District 42

District 43

District 44

District 45

District 46

District 47

District 48

District 49

References

External links
Public Disclosure Commission on Candidates
2016 Candidates who have filed 
Washington State Official 2016 Primary Results

Washington House of Representatives elections
2016 Washington (state) elections
Washington House of Representatives